The 2013–14 Cal State Bakersfield Roadrunners women's basketball team represented California State University, Bakersfield during the 2013–14 NCAA Division I women's basketball season. The Roadrunners were led by third year head coach Greg McCall and played their home games at the Icardo Center. The Roadrunners competed as members of the Western Athletic Conference. The Roadrunners would finish second in the WAC regular season and qualify for the 2014 WNIT.

Roster

Schedule
Source

|-
!colspan=9 style="background:#005EAB; color:#FACD00;"| Regular Season

|-
!colspan=9 style="background:#FACD00; color:#005EAB;"| 2014 WAC tournament

|-
!colspan=9 style="background:#FACD00; color:#005EAB;"| 2014 WNIT

See also
Cal State Bakersfield Roadrunners women's basketball
2015–16 Cal State Bakersfield Roadrunners women's basketball team
2013–14 Cal State Bakersfield Roadrunners men's basketball team

References

Cal State Bakersfield Roadrunners women's basketball seasons
Cal State Bakersfield
2014 Women's National Invitation Tournament participants
Cal State Bakersfield Roadrunners women's basketball
Cal State Bakersfield Roadrunners women's basketball